George William Baldry (26 May 1911 – October 1987) was an English professional footballer who played as a winger.

References

1911 births
1987 deaths
People from Cleethorpes
English footballers
Association football wingers
Humber United F.C. players
Grimsby Town F.C. players
Hull City A.F.C. players
Scunthorpe United F.C. players
Chelmsford City F.C. players
Shrewsbury Town F.C. players
English Football League players